Ambica Banerjee (28 August 1928 – 25 April 2013) was a member of the 15th Lok Sabha. He was elected as a Trinamool Congress candidate from Howrah (Lok Sabha constituency).

Banerjee was born in 1928 to Shri Anilmohon Banerjee and Shyama Devi in Sibpur, West Bengal. He graduated B.E In Mechanical Engineering from Hatfield Technical College and became Mechanical Engineer.

In 2001, 1996, 1991, 1987 and 1982 state assembly elections, Ambica Banerjee won from the Howrah Central assembly seat. Banerjee died in Kolkata on 25 April 2013.

References

1928 births
2013 deaths
India MPs 2009–2014
People from Howrah district
Indian National Congress politicians from West Bengal
Trinamool Congress politicians from West Bengal
West Bengal MLAs 1982–1987
West Bengal MLAs 1987–1991
West Bengal MLAs 1991–1996
West Bengal MLAs 1996–2001
West Bengal MLAs 2001–2006
Lok Sabha members from West Bengal